The Australia–Solomon Islands Maritime Boundary Agreement is a treaty between the governments of Australia and the Solomon Islands signed in Honiara on 13 September 1988 to delimit a maritime boundary in the ocean and the seabed.

The text of the treaty sets out a relatively short boundary composed of two straight-line maritime segments defined by three individual coordinate points. The boundary represents an approximate equidistant line between Australia and the Solomon Islands and defines the limit of Australian Fishing Zone and the Solomon Islands Exclusive Economic Zone.

The full name of the treaty is Agreement between the Government of Australia and the Government of Solomon Islands establishing certain sea and seabed boundaries. It entered into force on 14 April 1989 after it had been ratified by both countries.

Notes

References
 Anderson, Ewan W. (2003). International Boundaries: A Geopolitical Atlas. Routledge: New York. ;  OCLC 54061586
 Charney, Jonathan I., David A. Colson, Robert W. Smith. (2005). International Maritime Boundaries, 5 vols. Hotei Publishing: Leiden. ; ; ; ; ;  OCLC 23254092
Stuart B. Kaye (1995). V3IRAAAAYAAJAustralia's Maritime Boundaries. Wollongong, New South Wales: University of Wollongong Press. ;  OCLC 38390208

External links
Full text of agreement

Treaties concluded in 1988
Treaties entered into force in 1989
1988 in the Solomon Islands
1988 in Australia
1988 in Oceania
Australia–Solomon Islands border
Treaties of Australia
Treaties of the Solomon Islands
Boundary treaties
Australia–Solomon Islands relations
United Nations treaties
1988 in Australian law